Tulipa systola, the desert tulip, is a species of tulip native to the Middle East; Sinai, the Levant, Anatolia, Iraq and Iran. A geophyte adapted to arid conditions, it can remain dormant or produce only leaves in bad years based on environmental cues.

References

systola
Plants described in 1885